Euaresta bella is a species of tephritid or fruit flies in the family Tephritidae.

The larvae feed on Ambrosia artemisiifolia, the only known host. There is one generation per year.

References

Tephritinae
Insects described in 1862
Diptera of North America